Anton Bühler (15 June 1922 – 29 March 2013) was a Swiss equestrian. He was born in Zürich. He won a bronze medal in individual eventing at the 1960 Summer Olympics in Rome, and a silver medal in team eventing, together with Hans Schwarzenbach and Rudolf Günthardt. He also competed at the 1948 and 1972 Summer Olympics.

References

External links
 

1922 births
2013 deaths
Swiss male equestrians
Olympic silver medalists for Switzerland
Olympic bronze medalists for Switzerland
Equestrians at the 1948 Summer Olympics
Equestrians at the 1960 Summer Olympics
Equestrians at the 1972 Summer Olympics
Olympic medalists in equestrian
Medalists at the 1960 Summer Olympics
Sportspeople from Zürich
20th-century Swiss people